"Darling Nikki" is a song produced, arranged, composed, and performed by American musician Prince, originally released on his sixth studio album Purple Rain (1984). Though the song was not released as a single, it gained wide notoriety for its sexual lyricsin particular an explicit reference to female masturbationand was responsible for the creation of the infamous Parental Advisory sticker. The song tells the story of a "sex fiend" named Nikki who seduces the singer.

In the film Purple Rain, for which the album serves as the soundtrack, the song is directed toward Apollonia Kotero's character when she decides to work with Prince's character's rival (played by Morris Day). Compared with the slick production of the other songs on the album, "Darling Nikki" was deliberately engineered to have a raw and live feel. Near the end of the song, the music stops into the sound of rain and wind. There is singing, but it is played in reverse. Played forward, the vocals are Prince singing:

During the Purple Rain Tour performances of "Darling Nikki", the recording at the end was played forward. This can be heard in the 1985 live video Prince and the Revolution: Live.

Parental Advisory sticker

American social issues advocate Tipper Gore reportedly co-founded the Parents Music Resource Center (PMRC) in 1985 because she witnessed her daughter Karenna, who was 11 years old at the time, listening to "Darling Nikki". As examples of what they meant, PMRC published a list of 15 popular "filthy" songs, with "Darling Nikki" first. The PMRC would later become known for leading to the use of the well-known Parental Advisory sticker on album covers.

Charts

Cover versions
 In 1995, alternative rock band Whale issued "Darling Nikki" as one of the B-sides to their single "Pay For Me".
 In 2003, alternative rock band Foo Fighters recorded a cover of the song, which they included as a B-side on their single "Have It All". Though their version of "Darling Nikki" was never officially released as a single, it found success at American modern rock radio, peaking at No. 15 on the Hot Modern Rock Tracks chart. This version was later released on the vinyl-only compilation album Medium Rare. They also performed this song on the MTV Video Music Awards with Cee Lo Green guesting on vocals.

References

1984 songs
American hard rock songs
Prince (musician) songs
Songs written by Prince (musician)
Foo Fighters songs
Female masturbation
Song recordings produced by Prince (musician)
Obscenity controversies in music